Tim Lopes may refer to:
 Tim Lopes (journalist) (1950–2002), Brazilian investigative journalist
 Tim Lopes (baseball) (born 1994), American professional baseball player

See also

 Tim Lopez